Alfred Lahai Gbabai Brownell (born ) is a Liberian environmental activist and lawyer. Brownell met international attention because of his advocacy to prevent the destruction of tropical forests for palm oil production. After receiving death threats as a result of his work, he and his family fled Liberia in 2016.

Education and career 
Brownell graduated from the University of Liberia in 1994, receiving his Bachelor's of Science degree in General Agriculture. He then attended the University of Liberia's Louis Arthur Grimes School of Law, graduating in 1999. He subsequently attended the Tulane University Law School, where he earned a Master of Laws degree in 2002.

After finishing law school, Brownell co-authored legislation to protect forest land and the rights of the indigenous communities living on the land. However, he found that the government infringed on the newly implemented laws without performing impact studies or consulting with local communities. "The government proceeded to give away the same forest areas that we had struggled to protect. They started to award this forestland to mining companies, to agricultural companies, and to logging companies. They weren’t consulting the communities, they weren’t doing environmental impact studies, it was an official sitting up in his office, saying to these companies, ‘Here’s five million acres of land, go take that'", Brownell said in an interview. Brownell noted that the clear-cutting of forest for palm oil plantations left local communities worse off, because not enough jobs were created to employ residents who lost their land as a result of the development. As part of his work protecting threatened lands and advocating for local communities, Brownell founded Liberia's first environmental law non-governmental organization, Green Advocates International.

Around 2009, the government awarded large land leases to several multinational corporations which intended to clear-cut the forest and plant palm oil plantations. The company planned to turn the forest land into palm oil plantations, but local residents began to protest the clearing of their land without their consent. Brownell and his team documented the intimidation and harassment of community members, the destruction of forest land and homes, and the desecration of graves and sacred sites. He worked to file complaints with a global certification organization, the Roundtable on Sustainable Palm Oil, which called for a halt on development of the land. Subsequently, Brownell's family members were arrested and he was attacked, forcing him to flee the country.

After leaving Liberia, he became the "Distinguished Scholar in Residence at Northeastern University School of Law Program on Human Rights and the Global Economy".

References

External links

1960s births
Liberian lawyers
Liberian environmentalists
Living people
Northeastern University faculty
Tulane University Law School alumni
University of Liberia alumni
Goldman Environmental Prize awardees